(born February 26, 1964) is a Japanese artist and video game designer, best known for designing Sonic the Hedgehog and Dr. Eggman characters from Sega's Sonic the Hedgehog franchise. Although Yuji Naka created the original tech demo around which Sonic gameplay was based, the character in his prototype was a ball that lacked any specific features. Sonic Team considered numerous potential animal mascots before deciding on Ohshima's design, with an armadillo or hedgehog being the top choices because their spikes worked well with the concept of rolling into enemies.

After leaving Sonic Team, Ohshima formed an independent game company called Artoon in 1999. There he went on to work on such games as Pinobee (2001), Blinx: The Time Sweeper (2002), and Blinx 2: Masters of Time & Space (2004). In 2010, Artoon was absorbed into AQ Interactive, and Ohshima and other key members of Artoon left to form Arzest. Early in his career, he was credited under the nickname "Big Island" in a number of games, which is a literal translation of his family name.

Works

References

Further reading

External links

Sega Stars: Naoto Ohshima

1964 births
Japanese video game designers
Japanese video game directors
Living people
Sega people
Video game artists